Lestrod Roland (born 5 September 1992) is a Kittitian sprinter. He competed for the Saint Kitts and Nevis team in the 4 × 100 metres relay at the 2012 Summer Olympics; the team placed sixth in its heat with a time of 38.41 seconds and did not qualify for the final.

Personal bests

Competition record

1: Did not compete in the B final.

References

External links
IAAF Profile

1992 births
Living people
Saint Kitts and Nevis male sprinters
Olympic athletes of Saint Kitts and Nevis
Athletes (track and field) at the 2012 Summer Olympics
People from Basseterre
Athletes (track and field) at the 2014 Commonwealth Games
Commonwealth Games competitors for Saint Kitts and Nevis
Athletes (track and field) at the 2015 Pan American Games
Pan American Games competitors for Saint Kitts and Nevis